St John Ambulance is a volunteer-led, charitable non-governmental organisation dedicated to the teaching and practice of first aid and the support of the national emergency response system in England. Along with St John Ambulance Cymru, St John Ambulance Northern Ireland, and St John Scotland, it is one of four United Kingdom affiliates of the international St John Ambulance movement.

The St John Ambulance Association was founded in 1877 to provide first aid training. In 1887, the St John Ambulance Brigade was founded to provide uniformed medics at public events. In 1968, the two were merged into the present foundation. The organisation is a subsidiary of the England and the Islands priory (i.e. branch) of the Order of St John. Until 2012, it also managed St John Ambulance services in the Isle of Man and Channel Islands.

History
The St John Ambulance Association was set up in 1877 by the Venerable Order of Saint John to teach industrial workers first aid so that they could provide on-the-spot treatment in emergencies. Workers rarely had ready access to a doctor in 19th-century workplaces, and since accidents were frequent, death or disability from injuries was common. St John Ambulance set up training sessions across the country, particularly in workplaces in areas of heavy industry, but also villages, seaside towns and suburban areas. The organisation in Ipswich was founded in 1880.

In 1887, trained volunteers were organised into a uniformed Brigade to provide a first aid and ambulance service at public events. In many parts of England (and in parts of Scotland, until 1908), St John Ambulance was the first and only provider of an ambulance service right up to the middle of the 20th century, when the National Health Service was founded. When there were far fewer doctors and hospital beds than today, St John Ambulance nurses looked after the sick and injured in their own homes.

The St John Ambulance Brigade and St John Ambulance Association merged in 1968 to form St John Ambulance, a single organisation providing both training and first aid cover. In 1998, members of a paedophile ring which operated from within the St John Ambulance Brigade for several decades were arrested by police. The ring was headed by Leslie Gaines, superintendent of the Farnborough Division of the Brigade in Hampshire.

A significant restructure in 2012 further consolidated 43 counties into eight large regions based on the eight regions of the United Kingdom; these regions were then further merged during 2016 into four regions. During 2013, St John Ambulance trained approximately 278,000 adults through its workplace and community first aid programmes, and directly trained 91,000 schoolchildren. St John Ambulance personnel attended 45,000 public events, treating approximately 102,000 individuals. It also distributed 100,000 free first aid guides nationwide and its free smartphone app was downloaded by 148,000 people.

Key dates 
 1540: The original Order of St John, the Knights Hospitallers is disbanded in England by Henry VIII
 1826: An idea to re-establish the Order within England is put forward by some remaining French Knights of the original worldwide Order
 1841: The "St John's Day Declaration" is prepared to seek official recognition of the new Order by the original Order, now known as the Sovereign Military Order of Malta
 10 July 1877: St John Ambulance Association forms to teach first-aid in large railway centres and mining districts
 June 1887: St John Ambulance Brigade is formed
 14 May 1888: English Order of St John is granted a royal charter by Queen Victoria
 1908: By reciprocal agreement, St John Ambulance Brigade ceases to operate in Scotland and St Andrew's Ambulance Association ceases to operate in England
 March 1922: St John Ambulance Cadets is formed
 1968: The Association and Brigade merge to form a unified St John Ambulance
 January 1987: Badger Setts are introduced to celebrate 100 years since the formation of the Brigade
 1999: The Priory of England and the Islands is formed
 2012: St John Ambulance changes its county structure to a regionalised model across England
 2017–2018: Celebration of the organisation's 140th anniversary

Community first responders
St John Ambulance community first responders (CFRs) are trained volunteers who provide emergency treatment to people in their region and are dispatched by NHS ambulance control to medical emergency (999) calls, with the scheme operating as a community partnership between St John Ambulance and local ambulance service trusts. CFRs are dispatched to attend Category 1 "immediately life-threatening" calls such as cardiac arrest, diabetic emergency, unresponsive patient, breathing difficulties and seizures.

First aid cover at events

St John Ambulance provides first aid cover at thousands of events every year. This service is provided free to patients at the point of delivery, although a charge is often made to the event organiser for provision of the service at their event, to subsidise the charity's free cover of community and charity events, as well as the organisation's wider charitable output.

In addition to providing volunteer first aiders for events, where necessary St John Ambulance can provide paramedics, doctors, nurses and cycle responders, as well as mobile treatment centres, ambulances and other medical provision. Alongside support functions including command & control vehicles and incident catering units.

The organisation covers many major events across England including the London Marathon and Hyde Park concerts, as well as smaller and charitable events such as fetes and local fairs.

Training
St John Ambulance runs courses in first aid and health & safety for members of the public, training 254,000 people in 2013. Its First aid at work course is used by many companies to train designated individuals as first-aiders, as required by employment laws; specialist training is also available, including courses for schools staff and people working with children, and professional drivers.

Charitable community first aid courses also offer people of all ages the chance to learn basic first aid skills at little or no charge. In 2013, 24,000 people attended these courses.

Youth division 

St John Ambulance teaches first aid to thousands of young people, through programmes including Badgers (for seven- to ten-year-olds), Cadets (ten- to 17-year-olds), Student Volunteering Units (based in colleges and universities) and RISE, a specialist project aimed at those not in education, employment or training.

Cadets volunteer alongside their adult counterparts on events, making St John Ambulance the only youth organisation to have their young people using their skills in the "real world" with real patients.

In 2013, 91,000 schoolchildren were trained in first aid by St John Ambulance's schools team, while hundreds of thousands more had access to the organisation's training materials for schools, which are available to download for free from its Teach the difference website.

In 2014, the organisation also launched The Big First Aid Lesson, a free first aid lesson, which was streamed live into classrooms across England. 32,384 students took part in the inaugural event. Events took place the following three years. The Big First Aid Lesson was not held in 2018, to allow the team to focus on promoting first aid as part of the national curriculum.

Super Badger Award
St John Ambulance Badgers work towards the "Super Badger Award". This award consists of members completing 12 subjects, such as "Creative", "Global" and "Wild" Badger. The award is split into five sections, where Badgers advance through completing more subjects. Badgers who achieve their Super Badger receive a ceramic trophy of Bertie Badger, the Badger mascot, dressed in the original Badger uniform. The programme was completely reviewed, redesigned in 2016 and was launched in 2017, coinciding with the 30th anniversary of the formation of Badgers.

Grand Prior's Award scheme
The Grand Prior's Award is the primary award designed for Cadets. The award is an essential part of Cadet life, and consists of the completion of 16 subjects throughout Cadet membership, until the age of 18. The programme started being reviewed and updated in early 2017 and was released in mid-2021.

Amalfi Challenge
The Amalfi Award was open to all Cadets and adult volunteers aged 16 to 25. The structure of the award focussed on the personal task set by the individual. These tasks were categorised into service, relationships, society and challenge. Each participant had to undertake 12 tasks and after four, eight and 12 subjects a badge was awarded. The Amalfi Challenge is discontinued in England.

The Sovereign's Award
The Sovereign's Award is the premier achievement for young people, 16–25, within the Order of St John worldwide. The award, which includes a certificate personally signed by the Sovereign Head of the Order, Queen Elizabeth II, is given to young St John Ambulance volunteers in recognition of outstanding work in the areas of personal development, benefit to St John, and benefit to their community. It is awarded to a maximum of ten people worldwide, annually.

The awards are presented at the Young Achievers' Reception hosted by Anne, Princess Royal, Commandant-in-Chief for Youth. The event is also attended by the National Cadet of the Year for England and the Islands, National Cadet of the Year for Cymru Wales, Regional Cadets of the Year from England and the Islands, Deputy Cadet of the Year for Cymru Wales, District Cadets of the Year and nominated young people, aged 7–17.

Student volunteering units
St John Ambulance units dedicated to meeting the needs of student and university communities can be found at many institutes of higher education across England. These units, formerly known as LINKS units, were originally established at universities to form a "link" between Cadets and adult volunteering, allowing people to stay affiliated to the organisation and maintain their skills while in higher education. However, student volunteering units have become integral parts of the student community and the 90% of their members are new to St John Ambulance at the point of joining, as students that are new to university look for societies to join.

Raising of awareness and campaigning
St John Ambulance campaigns to raise awareness of the importance of first aid, and equip more people with life-saving skills. Its 2013 Save the Boy campaign, which featured an interactive element, demonstrating how to put a casualty in the recovery position, reached 15 million people through television and online media.

In January 2015, it launched a new campaign, The Chokeables, designed to teach parents how to treat a choking infant. The animated film featured the voices of actors John Hurt, David Walliams, Johnny Vegas and David Mitchell.

During the annual Save a Life September campaign, St John Ambulance trainers hold free first aid demonstrations in public spaces around the country, handing out first aid guides to attendees. A free first aid app for smartphones is also available to download.

Between 9–16 October 2018, St John Ambulance was a nationwide-leader in the promotion of Restart A Heart Day 2018, overseen by the Resuscitation Council UK, on behalf of the European Resuscitation Council and the International Liaison Committee on Resuscitation. Alongside partner organisations, St John Ambulance trained over 200,000, over the two weeks, in emergency resuscitation.

In 2022 St John Ambulance partnered up with BBC Radio Manchester following on from the Manchester Arena enquiry. St John volunteers trained free emergency first aid awareness to the public through out Manchester, and between May and the end of year over 16,000 members of the public were trained in a life saving skill.

Ambulance services

St John Ambulance supplies ambulance services in England, providing patient transport services to over 100,000 people a year, and working in partnership with NHS trusts, private healthcare groups, local authorities and individuals.

Ambulance Operations, the division of the organisation responsible for the provision of ambulances, provides a range of services including NHS frontline ambulance support, specialist transfer services for paediatric and neonatal patients and specialist emergency response services for bariatric patients. St John Ambulance has delivered over 1.2 million hours of volunteer frontline 999 ambulance support to NHS ambulance trusts since early 2020, treating over 150,000 patients. A national network of ambulance hubs allows both volunteer and salaried Emergency Ambulance Crew and Paramedics to deploy in support of almost every NHS ambulance trust in England. In some regions, such as the Isle of Wight, St John Ambulance crews are critical for the business continuity of the NHS ambulance trust and make up an integral part of their ability to respond to emergencies.

In 2010, St John Ambulance was awarded the Private Ambulance Service Team of the Year Award by the Ambulance Services Institute, for the work it carried out with the CATS (Great Ormond Street) and the South Thames Retrieval Service (Evelina Children's Hospital).

First aid and medical equipment services
St John Ambulance Supplies (often abbreviated to SJS) is a trading sub-division of St John Ambulance providing first aid and medical equipment and consumables, training equipment, publications, health and safety equipment and clothing. Where a profit is made, surplus from sales are diverted into supporting the charitable work of the Order of St John and the St John Ophthalmic Hospital in Jerusalem.

SJS opened its doors at St John's Gate in Clerkenwell on 12 February 1879, and was originally known as The Stores Depot. It is now a major commercial operation supplying to the public, private and voluntary sector. The store is now only available online.

Vehicles
Originally, individual divisions of St John Ambulance were responsible for providing their own vehicles. These have taken many and varied forms, beginning with horse-drawn ambulances. Even into the late twentieth century, with some centralisation of control and classification of vehicle types such as Motor Ambulance Units (the title arising historically as a distinction from horse-drawn units), First Aid Posts and Rapid Deployment Vehicles, there remained within the organisation an enormous range of deployed vehicles of different types and even assorted local vehicle liveries. Some ambulances were donated second-hand from industrial plants, some were purchased (from different suppliers) and some were local conversions of commercial vehicles. At the start of the twenty-first century, new legislation regarding emergency ambulances effectively rendered a significant proportion of the then-current St John Ambulance fleet redundant. The solution was the development of a specialist St John Ambulance vehicle, which was designed jointly by the organisation and vehicle manufacturer Renault. The result was the Crusader 900 ambulance.

An early assessment suggested that 100 of the Crusader ambulances (costing, at that time, £40,000 each) would be required immediately, representing an investment of £4million. In 2000, St John Ambulance committed itself to raising £2M by public subscription, whilst English and Welsh Freemasons committed a further £2M, supplying 50 Crusader ambulances which were handed over in local ceremonies across the country during 2000 and 2001. This very large donation allowed the rapid transformation of the national St John Ambulance fleet of front-line ambulances within a much shorter time-scale than could otherwise have been possible. Subsequently, many local Provinces of Freemasons have maintained relations with their local St John Ambulance County units and supported the running costs of these vehicles or even donated further (additional) Crusader ambulances.

By 2004, the national St John Ambulance emergency vehicle fleet was in a standard corporate livery, with standard vehicle types:

 Crusader – a front-line emergency ambulance, based on the Renault Master (or similar);
 4x4 ambulance – a four-wheel drive emergency ambulance, based on the Nissan Patrol (or similar), but with additional headroom, for rural and off-road deployment;
 Support vehicle – either based on a van, car or a 4x4 vehicle, Support Units can be used for a variety of purposes. For instance, a Support Car may be used to carry members to and from duties, in a logistical capacity, or even as a response vehicle on larger duties. Support Vans are normally used only for logistical purposes. Mini-buses are also available and can be used for logistics or the transport of members.

Specialist vehicles
St John Ambulance also maintains specialist response options in particular locations, such as Cycle Response Units, control and command units, as well as larger vehicles or trailers used as static first aid posts.

Training 
Volunteers receive training according to the role they fulfil. Those volunteering to provide Event First Aid services first attend a four-day Operational First Aid (FA) course covering common injuries and illnesses, basic life support, administration of over-the-counter medication, major trauma and casualty care; in addition to organisation-specific elements such as safe discharge and patient report forms.

Further progression is to the Advanced First Aider (AFA) course, a four-day course covering medical gasses administration, basic airway management, splints, taking vital signs and manual handling with equipment. Advanced First Aider is the standard required for entry to the Cycle Response Unit, Medical Response Team (a specialist resource for working in dense crowds) and Ambulance Training.

Ambulance training, open to both existing First Aid volunteers and external candidates, takes the form of a 6-month training program with volunteers qualifying as Emergency Ambulance Crew (EAC). A small number of paid staff are also trained to the same standard to provide an organisational personnel baseline to fulfil core NHS and specialist contracts. The Emergency Ambulance Crew training program encompasses a combination of classroom and distance learning alongside practical assessments, written exams and a portfolio. Course content is in line with that of NHS Emergency Ambulance Crew and includes medical gasses administration, airway management (including supraglottic devices), intermediate life support, trauma care, obstetrics, paediatrics, major incident response, emergency medications administration and in-depth anatomy and physiology.  Once qualified, EAC's must spend a minimum of 12 months (reduced to 6 months for paid staff) as Newly Qualified Emergency Ambulance Crew (NQEAC) before being allowed to practice autonomously. Volunteer Emergency Ambulance Crew are deployed as frontline 999 crews in support of the NHS, as ambulance crews to events and as part of specific community response programs such as night time economy support. An additional 4-week Level 3 CERAD blue light driving is available upon qualifying as an EAC and all SJA ambulance crews must be staffed by at least one emergency response driver.

The training for those delivering Youth Services comprises emergency life support training, coupled with training from the organisation's youth leader training suite including Essential skills in youth work and Leadership skills in youth work, depending on the volunteer's role.

In addition to medical training offered, members have the opportunity to carry out other operational roles. These include event planning, event management, radio communications/control, plus other support roles.

Healthcare professionals 
Qualified healthcare professionals may also volunteer their time in St John Ambulance including nurses, paramedics, physiotherapists and doctors. All healthcare professionals have their qualifications and professional status checked with the appropriate regulatory body before practising in St John Ambulance. Professionals can carry out any skill appropriate to their type, level of training, competence and when relevant to the situation or patient. Healthcare professionals wear coloured rank slides to distinguish them from internally trained first aiders and ambulance personnel.

Student HCPs who are attending an event alongside an HCP (nurse, doctor, physiotherapist or paramedic) may be mentored/supervised by that Event HCP to provide out of hospital care when directly supervised and where resources permit. Whenever unsupervised (for example if their HCP is called away to see another patient), they revert strictly to the level of their SJA training, and can not practice as a Student HCP.

Regional structure
In 2012, St John Ambulance was reorganised into a regional structure, to increase accountability and maximise charitable outputs. Previously the organisation had been divided into 42 semi-autonomous county organisations.

As part of the reorganisation, a more streamlined structure was introduced, with fewer layers of management between the front-line and the St John Ambulance board.

St John Ambulance regions
The four regions are:
 East  East and East Midlands
 London & South  London and the South East
 North  North East, North West and Yorkshire and the Humber
 West  West Midlands and South West

Each region is managed by a paid regional director and is responsible for the delivery of programmes developed and overseen by the national headquarters (NHQ). All regions are accountable to the Care Quality Commission (CQC) and are independently inspected by the CQC against 14 different outcomes, such as care and welfare of people who use the services, cleanliness and infection control and supporting workers.

During regionalisation in 2012, St John Ambulance in Guernsey, Jersey and the Isle of Man became separate from England.

District
Each region is divided into several districts. A district may contain one or more former counties from the previous structure and may only have part of a county in. Each district is managed by a district manager (volunteer), and area managers report to them. District managers are in overall charge of all activities in their district, assisted by the area managers. They have a support team of district specialists in place coordinating functions such as event cover and youth provision, but they have no line management responsibility and report to their respective regional departmental manager. Each district usually contains three to six areas.

Area
Districts are further divided into geographic areas, led by an area manager (volunteer). Unit managers report to the area manager, and the area manager is in overall charge of the activities of the units in their area, within the boundaries of policies, etc., set by Regional Headquarters (RHQ) and NHQ. They are assisted/advised by district specialists to provide the day-to-day functions of the organisation, such as member training and event cover. Each area usually contains 815 units.

Unit
A unit (formerly a division) is the smallest administrative division of St John Ambulance. Most volunteers are managed within a unit by another volunteer. An adult unit is led by a unit manager, who may have one or more assistant unit managers to assist them. The unit usually has a weekly meeting where members train, practice their skills, and occasionally have visits from guest speakers. Units plan and execute the cover of most of the events requested of the organisation, supported by their area and district managers, district specialists and regional events team. Units are where most people start their time in the organisation. There are two types of youth units: Badger Setts (for ages 7–10) and cadets (for ages 10–18). They are typically based on the same site as an adult unit are supervised by adult volunteers.

Other types of units exist, such as Student Volunteering units within universities, cycle response units, other specialised units, and sometimes informal social groups, each with a distinctive command, management or leadership structure. Specialised units are sometimes "virtual units" meaning the unit does not physically meet regularly but works over the internet etc. Historically, there were ambulance divisions (for men), nursing divisions (for women), ambulance cadet divisions (for boys) and nursing cadet divisions (for girls). No single-sex divisions remain.

Ambulance Operations 
Whilst all volunteers are assigned a home unit, volunteer Emergency Ambulance Crew are also seconded to a "Virtual Ambulance Unit" structured around the regional NHS ambulance trust they deploy in support of. Virtual Ambulance Unit's (VAU's) are managed by a combination of Local, District and Regional Ambulance Leads who provide managerial advice and support specifically to Ambulance Operations staff due to the nature of the role. CPD, portfolio support and ambulance specific development is managed through the VAU whilst HR pertaining to the individual volunteer and event support is managed through the volunteers home unit.

Uniform and ranks 

St John Ambulance first aid personnel wear a service delivery uniform consisting of a green shirt; black combat trousers; and either a green and black Parka Jacket, a reversible fleece, or green and black softshell jacket with appropriate black footwear. Epaulettes on the shirts vary in colour depending on the profession of the volunteer: Black for first aid personnel, green for registered paramedics, grey for registered nurses, and red for registered doctors. Healthcare professionals' (HCPs) epaulettes do not show specialism such as midwives. Student HCPs wear black epaulettes until they are qualified in their respective profession.

On the service delivery uniform, a role bar is worn to denote the wearer's role in that event.  High-visibility two-tone yellow-and-green tabards (accepted to denote medical personnel) are only worn when the risk assessment of the event calls for it.

Badgers wear a branded black polo-shirt and a branded black jumper, where they can wear the badges they earn through the Super Badger programme.

Cadets wear the same uniform as their adult counterparts, though are permitted to wear a brassard on their left arm (during ceremonial processions only; not whilst performing clinical duties) where they are able to show their current/highest Grand Prior Award badge at the top-centre; up to three badges, including duty hours, Duke of Edinburgh Award, Sovereign's Award, national competitions winners badge, Amalfi Challenge (discontinued) or Diana Award (if won for services to St John Ambulance); and the Super Badger award (if achieved) at the bottom of the brassard.

A ceremonial uniform still exists for adult volunteers, consisting of a peaked cap, tailored jacket, white shirt, black trousers, black shoes and a clip-on tie. All rank insignia are worn on the outer layer of the jacket.

British Armed Forces 
A section of St John Ambulance, St John Ambulance British Forces Overseas (SJABFO), has British units running where there are a large number of British servicemen and women with their families overseas. These are namely in Cyprus, with units in Germany beginning to close in preparation for the British withdrawal from Germany in 2019. The divisions are directly linked to the UK and national headquarters so that members can transfer to another unit or region/district/area as they would be able to do at home. Cyprus and Germany are a part of St John Ambulance as two districts, unattached to any region, within the organisational structure. The uniform reflects the current service delivery uniform in England.

Volunteers can receive training in the full range of St John Ambulance qualifications.

The overseas forces units (then "divisions") were founded in 1980. They remained very strong for several years, however, as the forces in Germany were reduced many divisions closed. Since the final withdrawal of forces in Germany is expected in the next few years, the role for St John Ambulance will end. However, the two units in Cyprus founded in 1991 will continue to provide a service to the community there.

As well as providing medical cover at events, St John Ambulance British Forces provide first-aid training for people of all ages.

St John Ambulance British Forces Overseas works closely with the German Ambulance Services, particularly the sister organisation, Die Johanniter, in providing first aid and ambulance cover German public events where many British or English Speakers are expected to attend. Members can occasionally be seen on their non-emergency and emergency vehicles responding to public calls. St John Ambulance can also be seen working with Malteser, the German Red Cross and local fire brigades which provide ambulance services. The German Emergency Services also assist St John Ambulance at British events on military areas where many German civilians are expected to attend. With the planned withdrawal of British forces from Germany in 2019, this partnership, in this aspect at least, will be discontinued.

Relations with the Order of St John and other organisations 
Although the Order of St John is largely seen as a Christian organisation for historical reasons, St John Ambulance does not restrict membership to, or promote, any particular religion or denomination. Technically, it falls under the sovereignty of the King, and thus is linked to the Church of England; however, this relationship is more tradition than authority, and adult members are not required to pledge allegiance to or support either the monarchy or the Christian faith. Historically, Cadet members pledged to join to the monarch and God, though this is no longer a requirement.

St John Ambulance personnel serve alongside the British Red Cross, whose members also undergo advanced training in first aid and event cover. However, the British Red Cross no longer has an event first-aid (EFA) department due to lack of profit and funding. (The Red Cross EFA department officially closed in March 2020.) Both organisations' work supports the statutory services in times of civil emergency or crisis. In peacetime, St John Ambulance is senior to the Red Cross. However, in wartime, the Red Cross would become senior due to an agreement with the International Red Cross and Red Crescent Movement.

St John Ambulance, St. Andrew's First Aid of Scotland and the British Red Cross co-author and authorise the official First Aid Manual, the de facto UK guide for emergency first aid.

Response to the COVID-19 pandemic 
During the COVID-19 pandemic in England, St John Ambulance equipped their personnel with protective equipment to prevent the spread. St John Ambulance announced in January 2021 that their staff would be volunteering to help in the national vaccination program for the Oxford-AstraZeneca vaccine, alongside NHS staff.

See also
 St John Ambulance Ireland
 Service Medal of the Order of St John

References

External links

 
 Caring on the Home Front A website dedicated to the memories of St John Ambulance and British Red Cross volunteers during World War II.

England
Medical and health organisations based in England
Charities based in London
Youth organisations based in England
1877 establishments in England
Organizations established in 1877
Ambulance services in England